Sakha, officially the Republic of Sakha (Yakutia), is the largest republic of Russia, located in the Russian Far East, along the Arctic Ocean, with a population of roughly 1 million. Sakha comprises half of the area of its governing Far Eastern Federal District, and is the world's largest country subdivision, covering over 3,083,523 square kilometers (1,190,555 sq mi). Yakutsk, which is the world's coldest major city, is its capital and largest city. The republic has a reputation for an extreme and severe climate, with the lowest temperatures in the Northern Hemisphere being recorded in Verkhoyansk and Oymyakon, and regular winter averages commonly dipping below  in Yakutsk. The hypercontinental tendencies also result in warm summers for much of the republic.

Sakha was first home to hunting-gathering and reindeer herding Tungusic and Paleosiberian peoples such as the Evenks and Yukaghir. Migrating from the area around Lake Baikal, the Turkic Sakha people first settled along the middle Lena river sometime between the 9th and 16th centuries, likely in several waves, bringing the pastoral economic system of Central Asia with them. 

The Russians colonised and incorporated the area as Yakutsk Oblast into the Tsardom of Russia in the early-mid 17th century, obliging the indigenous peoples of the area to pay fur tribute. While the initial period following the Russian conquest saw the Sakha population drop by 70%, the Imperial period also saw the expansion of the native Yakuts from the middle Lena along the Vilyuy River to the north and the east displacing other indigenous groups. Yakutia saw some of the last battles of the Russian Civil War, and the Bolshevik authorities re-organized Yakutsk Oblast into the autonomous Yakut ASSR in 1922. The Soviet era saw the migration of many Slavs, specifically Russians and Ukrainians, into the area.

On September 27, 1990, the area became the Yakutskaya-Sakha Soviet Socialist Republic, and on December 27, 1991, it became the "Republic of Sakha (Yakutia)" (in Russian, "Республика Саха (Якутия)").

Etymology
The exonym Yakut comes from the Evenk term Yako (also yoqo, ñoqa, or ñoka), which was the term the Evenks used to describe the Sakha. This was in turn picked up by the Russians. The Yukaghirs, another neighboring people in Siberia, use the exonym yoqol ~ yoqod- ~ yoqon- (Tundra Yukaghir) or yaqal ~ yaqad- ~ yaqan- (Kolyma Yukaghir). 

The self-designation Sakha is probably of the same origin (*jaqa > Sakha following regular sound changes in the course of development of the Yakut language) as the Evenk and Yukaghir exonyms for the Yakuts. It is pronounced as Haka by the Dolgans, whose language is either a dialect or a close relative of the Yakut language.

Geography

 Borders:
 internal: Chukotka Autonomous Okrug (660 km)(E), Magadan Oblast (1520 km)(E/SE), Khabarovsk Krai (2130 km)(SE), Amur Oblast (S), Zabaykalsky Krai (S), Irkutsk Oblast (S/SW), Krasnoyarsk Krai (W).
 water: Arctic Ocean (including Laptev Sea and Eastern Siberian Sea) (N).
 Highest point: Peak Pobeda (3,003 m), Mus-Khaya Mountain Peak (2959 m or 3,011 m)
 Maximum N->S distance: 
 Maximum E->W distance: 

Sakha stretches to the Henrietta Island in the far north and is washed by the Laptev and Eastern Siberian Seas of the Arctic Ocean. These waters, the coldest and iciest of all seas in the Northern Hemisphere, are covered by ice for 9–10 months of the year. New Siberian Islands are a part of the republic's territory.

Sakha can be divided into three great vegetation belts. About 40% of Sakha lies above the Arctic circle and all of it is covered by permafrost which greatly influences the region's ecology and limits forests in the southern region. Arctic and subarctic tundra define the middle region, where lichen and moss grow as great green carpets and are favorite pastures for reindeer. In the southern part of the tundra belt, scattered stands of dwarf Siberian pine and larch grow along the rivers. Below the tundra is the vast taiga forest region. Larch trees dominate in the north and stands of fir and pine begin to appear in the south. Taiga forests cover about 47% of Sakha and almost 90% of the cover is larch.

The Sakha Republic is the site of Pleistocene Park, a project directed at recreating Pleistocene tundra grasslands by stimulating the growth of grass with the introduction of animals which thrived in the region during the late Pleistocene – early Holocene period.

Time zones

Sakha is the only federal subject of Russia which uses more than one time zone. Sakha spans three time zones. Like the rest of Russia, it does not use daylight saving time.

Rivers

The largest river is the navigable Lena River (4,400 km). As it moves northward, it includes hundreds of small tributaries located in the Verkhoyansk Range.
 Lena River
 Vilyuy River (2,650 km) Lena River tributary
 Markha River (1,181 km) Vilyuy River tributary
 Morkoka River (812 km) Markha River tributary
 Tyung River (1,092 km) Vilyuy River tributary
 Aldan River (2,273 km) Lena River tributary
 Amga River (1,462 km) Aldan River tributary
 Maya River (1,053 km) Aldan River tributary
 Uchur River (812 km) Aldan River tributary
 Olyokma River (1,320 km) Lena River tributary
 Linde River (804 km) Lena River tributary
 Nyuya River (798 km) Lena River tributary
 Olenyok River (2,292 km)
 Kolyma River (2,129 km)
 Indigirka River (1,726 km)
 Selennyakh River (796 km) Indigirka River tributary
 Alazeya River (1,590 km)
 Anabar River (939 km)
 Yana River (872 km)
 Adycha River (715 km) Yana River tributary
 Oldzho River (330 km) Yana River tributary
 Bytantay River (620 km) Yana River tributary

Lakes

There are over 800,000 lakes in the republic. Major lakes and reservoirs include:
 Lake Bolshoye Morskoye
 Lake Bustakh
 Lake Emanda
 Lake Mogotoyevo
 Lake Nedzheli
 Lake Nerpichye
 Lake Ozhogino
 Lake Suturuokha
 Lake Tabanda
 Ulakhan-Kyuel
 Vilyuy Reservoir

Mountains

Sakha's greatest mountain range, the Verkhoyansk Range, runs parallel and east of the Lena River, forming a great arc that begins in the Sea of Okhotsk and ends in the Laptev Sea.

The Chersky Range runs east of the Verkhoyansk Range and has the highest peak in Sakha, Peak Pobeda (3,147 m).  The second highest peak is Peak Mus-Khaya reaching 3,011 m.

The Stanovoy Range borders Sakha in the south.

Peninsulas
The Republic's extensive coastline contains a number of peninsulas; from west to east the most prominent are:
 Uryung-Tumus Peninsula
 Nordvik Peninsula
 Terpyay-Tumsa Peninsula
 Bykovsky Peninsula
 Buor-Khaya Peninsula
 Manyko Peninsula
 Shirokostan Peninsula
 Merkushina Strelka Peninsula
 Lopatka Peninsula
 Dogukan Peninsula

Islands
From west to east the main islands of Sakha are:
 Preobrazheniya Island
 Bolshoy Begichev Island
 Maliy Begichev Island
 Peschany Island
 Salkay Island
 Orto Ary
 Daldalakh
 Dyangylakh Island
 Dunay Islands
 Leykina Island
 Islands of the Lena Delta
 Brusneva Island
 Muostakh Island
 Ulakhan Ary Island
 Yarok Island
 Shelonsky Islands
 Makar Island
 Stolbovoy Island
 New Siberian Islands (by far the largest group)
 De Long Islands
 Medvezhyi Islands
 Kolesovsky Island
 Kolesovskaya Otmel
 Gabyshevskiy Island
 Kamenka Island
 Markhayanovskiy Island
 Gusmp Island
 Sukhanyy Island

Natural resources
Sakha is well endowed with raw materials. The soil contains large reserves of oil, gas, coal, diamonds, gold, silver, tin, tungsten and many others. Sakha produces 99% of all Russian diamonds and over 25% of the diamonds mined in the world.

Climate
Sakha is known for its climate extremes, with the Verkhoyansk Range being the coldest area in the Northern Hemisphere. Some of the lowest natural temperatures ever recorded have been here.

Average annual precipitation: 200 mm (central parts) to 700 mm (mountains of Eastern Sakha).

Administrative divisions

History

Pre-history

Siberia, and particularly Sakha, is of paleontological significance, as it contains bodies of prehistoric animals from the Pleistocene Epoch, preserved in ice or permafrost. In 2015, the frozen bodies of Dina and Uyan the cave lion cubs were found. Bodies of Yuka and another woolly mammoth from Oymyakon, a woolly rhinoceros from the Kolyma River, and bison and horses from Yukagir have also been found. In June 2019, the severed yet preserved head of a large wolf from the Pleistocene, dated to over 40,000 years ago, was found close to the Tirekhtyakh River.

Ymyakhtakh culture (c. 2200–1300 BC) was a Late Neolithic culture of Siberia, with a very large archaeological horizon. Its origins were in Sakha, in the Lena river basin. From there it spread both to the east and to the west.

Early history
The Turkic Sakha people or Yakuts may have settled the area as early as the 9th century or as late as the 16th century, though most likely there were several migrations. They migrated up north from around Lake Baikal to the middle Lena due to pressure by the Buryats, a Mongolic group.

The Sakha displaced earlier, much smaller populations who lived on hunting and reindeer herding, introducing the pastoralist economy of Central Asia. The indigenous populations of Paleosiberian and Tungusic stock
were mostly assimilated to the Sakha by the 17th century.

Russian conquest

The Tsardom of Russia began its conquest of the region in the 17th century, moving east after the defeat of the Khanate of Sibir. Tygyn, a king of the Khangalassky Sakha, granted territory for Russian settlement in return for a military pact that included war against indigenous rebels of all North Eastern Asia (Magadan, Chukotka, Kamchatka and Sakhalin). Kull, a king of the Megino-Khangalassky Sakha, began a Sakha conspiracy by allowing the first stockade construction.

In August 1638, the Moscow Government formed a new administrative unit with the administrative center of Lensky Ostrog (Fort Lensky), the future city of Yakutsk, which had been founded by Pyotr Beketov in 1632.

The arrival of Russian settlers at the remote Russkoye Ustye in the Indigirka delta is also believed to date from the 17th century. The Siberian Governorate was established as part of the Russian Empire in 1708.

Russian settlers began to form a community in the 18th century, which adopted certain Sakha customs and was often called Yakutyane (Якутя́не) or Lena Early Settlers (ленские старожилы). However, the influx of later settlers had assimilated themselves into the Russian mainstream by the 20th century.

Russian Empire
In an administrative reform of 1782, Irkutsk Governorate was created. In 1805, Yakutsk Oblast was split from Irkutsk Governorate.

Yakutsk Oblast in the early 19th century marked the easternmost territory of the Russian Empire, including such Far Eastern (Pacific) territories as were acquired, known as Okhotsk Okrug within Yakutsk Oblast. With the formation of Primorskaya Oblast in 1856, the Russian territories of the Pacific were detached from Sakha.

The Russians established agriculture in the Lena River basin. The members of religious groups who were exiled to Sakha in the second half of the 19th century began to grow wheat, oats, and potatoes. The fur trade established a cash economy. Industry and transport began to develop at the end of the 19th century and in the beginning of the Soviet period. This was also the beginning of geological prospecting, mining, and local lead production. The first steam-powered ships and barges arrived.

Sakha's remoteness, compared to the rest of Siberia, made it a place of exile of choice for both Tsarist and Communist governments of Russia. Among the famous Tsarist-era exiles were the democratic writer Nikolay Chernyshevsky; Doukhobor conscientious objectors, whose story was told to Leo Tolstoy by Vasily Pozdnyakov; the Socialist Revolutionary and writer Vladimir Zenzinov, who left an account of his Arctic experiences; and Polish socialist activist Wacław Sieroszewski, who pioneered in ethnographic research on the Sakha people.

A Sakha national movement first emerged during the 1905 Revolution. A Yakut Union was formed under the leadership of a Sakha lawyer and city councilor by the name of Vasily Nikiforov, which criticized the policies and effects of Russian colonialism, and demanded representation in the State Duma. The Yakut Union acted to make the city council of Yakutsk stand down and was joined by thousands of Sakha from the countryside, but the leaders were arrested and the movement fizzled out by April 1906. Their demand for a Sakha repsentative in the Duma, however, was granted.

Soviet era
Sakha was home to the last stage of the Russian Civil War, the Yakut Revolt. On April 27, 1922, former Yakutsk Oblast was proclaimed the Yakut ASSR, although in fact the eastern part of the territory, including the city of Yakutsk, was controlled by the White Russians.

The early Soviet period saw a flourishing of Sakha literature as men such as Platon Oyunsky wrote down in writing the traditionally oral and improvised olonkho, in addition to composing their own works. Many early Sakha leaders, including Oyunsky, died in the Great Purge.

Sakha experienced significant collectivization between 1929 and 1934, with the number of households experiencing collectivization rising from 3.6% in 1929 to 41.7% in 1932. Policies by which the Sakha were harshly affected resulted in the population dropping from 240,500 in 1926 down to 236,700 at the 1959 census.

Sakha's demographics shifted wildly during the Soviet period as ethnic Russians and Ukrainians, among other groups, settled the area en masse, primarily in Yakutsk and the industrial south. Previously, even Yakutsk had been primarily Sakha and Sakha-speaking. With the end of korenizatsiya, usage of the Sakha language was restricted in urban areas such as Yakutsk, which became primarily Russian-speaking.

Post-Soviet era
In 1992, after the fall of the Soviet Union, Sakha was recognized in Moscow as the Sakha (Yakutia) Republic under the jurisdiction of the Russian Federation. Sakha is historically part of Russian Siberia, but since the formation of the Far Eastern Federal District in 2000, it is administratively part of the Russian Far East.

Demographics
Population:  Population density is 0.31 per km2 (2019), which is one of the lowest among Russian districts. Urban population - 65,45% (2018).

Settlements

Vital statistics

Source: Russian Federal State Statistics Service

Ethnic groups

According to the 2021 Census, the ethnic composition was:
 469,348 Sakha (55.3%)
 276,986 Russians (32.6%)
 24,334 Evenks (2.9%)
 13,233 Evens (1.6%)
 11,203 Kyrgyz (1.3%)
 7,169 Ukrainians (0.8%)
 6,572 Buryats (0.8%)
 5,620 Tajiks (0.7%)

Historical population figures are shown below:

Languages
The official languages are both Russian and Sakha, also known as Yakut, which is spoken by 47% of the total population, including 93% of Yakuts. The Sakha language is a member of the Turkic language family, in the Siberian Turkic branch, and it is closely related to the Dolgan language of the former Taymyr Dolgano-Nenets AO, and somewhat related to other Siberian Turkic languages such as Tuvan, Altai, Khakas, Shor & others. Influence from Tungusic languages (especially Evenk) and Mongolian are recorded.

Besides those 2 languages, the Sakha Republic is also where much of the world's speakers of Tungusic languages reside, most of whom either speak Evenk, or the Even language (formerly known as Lamut). Additionally, the lects of the Yukaghir language-family is spoken in the northeast, which is one of the Paleosiberian languages (alternatively considered as a language isolate due to lack of research).There are proposed links to Uralic languages, though these are dubious.

Religion

Before the arrival of the Russian Empire, the majority of the local population was Tengrist, similar to the other Turkic people of Central Asia, or in Paleoasian indigenous shamanism with both 'light' (community leading) and 'dark' (healing through spirit journey) shamans. Under the Russians, the local population was converted to the Russian Orthodox Church and required to take Orthodox Christian names, but in practice generally continued to follow traditional religions. During the Soviet era, most or all of the shamans died without successors.

In the 1990s, a neopagan shamanist movement called aiyy yeurekhé was founded by the controversial journalist Ivan Ukhkhan and a philologist calling himself Téris. This group and others cooperated to build a shaman temple in downtown Yakutsk in 2002.

Currently, while Orthodox Christianity maintains a following (however, with very few priests willing to be stationed outside of Yakutsk), there is interest and activity toward renewing the traditional religions. As of 2008, Orthodox leaders described the worldview of the republic's indigenous population (or, rather, those among the population who are not completely indifferent to religion) as dvoyeverie (dual belief system), or a "tendency toward syncretism", as evidenced by the locals sometimes first inviting a shaman, and then an Orthodox priest to carry out their rites in connection with some event in their life.

According to the Information Center under the President of Sakha Republic (Информационный центр при Президенте РС(Я)), the religious demography of the republic was as follows: Orthodoxy: 44.9%, Shamanism: 26.2%, Non-religious: 23.0%, New religious movements: 2.4%, Islam: 1.2%, Buddhism: 1.0%, Protestantism: 0.9%, Catholicism: 0.4%.

The Russian Orthodox Eparchy (Diocese) of Yakutia is led by Bishop Roman (Lukin) of Yakutsk (2011).

According to a 2012 survey, 37.8% of the population of Sakha adheres to the Russian Orthodox Church, 13% to Tengrism or Sakha shamanism, 2% to Islam, 1% are unaffiliated Christians, 1% to forms of Protestantism, and 0.4% to Tibetan Buddhism. In addition, 26% of the population deems itself atheist, 17% is "spiritual but not religious", and 1.8% follows other religions or did not give an answer to the question.

Education

The most important facilities of higher education include North-Eastern Federal University (previously Yakutsk State University) and Yakutsk State Agricultural Academy.

Politics

The head of government in Sakha is the Head (previously President). The first Head of the Sakha Republic was Mikhail Yefimovich Nikolayev. As of 2021, the head is Aysen Nikolayev, who took office on May 28, 2018.

The supreme legislative body of state authority in Sakha is a unicameral State Assembly known as the Il Tumen.  The government of the Sakha (Yakutia) Republic is the executive body of state authority.

The republic fosters close cultural, political, economic, and industrial relations with the independent Turkic states through membership in organizations such as the Turkic Council and the Joint Administration of Turkic Arts and Culture.

Economy

Industry generates slightly above 50% of the gross national product of Sakha, stemming primarily from mineral exploitation. Industrial enterprises are concentrated in the capital Yakutsk, as well as in Aldan, Mirny, Neryungri, Pokrovsk, and Udachny. The diamond, gold, and tin ore mining industries are the major focus of the economy. Uranium ore is beginning to be mined. The Turkic-speaking Sakha people are engaged in politics, government, finance, economy, and cattle-breeding (horses and cows for milk and meat). The Paleoasian indigenous peoples are hunters, fishermen, and reindeer herders. As of 2008, Sakha Republic is the 19th most developed federal subject in Russia.

The largest companies in the region include Alrosa, Yakutugol, Yakutskenergo, and Yakutia Airlines.

Transportation
Water transport ranks first for cargo turnover. There are six river ports, two seaports (Tiksi and Zelyony Mys). Four shipping companies, including the Arctic Sea Shipping Company, operate in the republic. The republic's main waterway is the Lena River, which links Yakutsk with the rail station of Ust-Kut in Irkutsk Oblast.

Air transport is the most important for transporting people. Airlines connect the republic with most regions of Russia. Yakutsk Airport has an international terminal.

Two federal roads pass the republic. They are Yakutsk–Skovorodino (A360 Lena highway) and Yakutsk–Magadan (M56 Kolyma Highway).
However, due to the presence of permafrost, use of asphalt is not practical, and therefore the roads are made of clay.  When heavy rains blow over the region, the roads often turn to mud, sometimes stranding hundreds of travelers in the process.

The Berkakit–Tommot railroad is currently in operation. It links the Baikal Amur Mainline with the industrial centers in South Sakha. Construction of the Amur Yakutsk Mainline continues northward; the railway was completed to Nizhny Bestyakh, across the river from Yakutsk, in 2013. Though this one-track railroad from Tommot to Nizhny Bestyakh is under temporary operation (30% of its full capacity), the federal agency for railways declared that this railroad would be in full operation in fall 2015. Also the private company is now constructing the transport and logistics center in Nizhny Bestyakh.

Media

NVK Sakha (national broadcaster company Sakha, Национальная вещательная компания Саха, "Саха" көрдөрөр иһитиннэрэр тэрилтэтэ), the largest media company in the Republic of Sakha (Yakutia). The company owns dozens of TV channels in Yakutia, Russia, and other countries. The main broadcasting languages are Yakut, English, Russian and Evenk. It was founded in 1992 after the collapse of the USSR. 70% of the shares are owned by the Russian VGTRK, 25% are owned by Yakutia, and 5% are in free float. NVK Sakha owns its own animation and film production studios, and some music studios. Since 2018, it has also been streaming 24/7 on YouTube.

Culture

Points of interest in the city of Yakutsk include:
 the State Russian drama theatre named after Alexander Pushkin 
 the Sakha Theater named after Platon Oyunsky
 the State Academic Opera and Ballet Theatre named after D. K. Sivtsev
 Suorun Omoloon, the Young Spectator's Theatre

There are a number of museums as well. These include the National Fine Arts Museum of Sakha, the Museum of Local Lore and History named after E. Yaroslavsky, and the Khomus Museum and Museum of Permafrost.

In the 2010s, a movie boom began in Yakutia. The local film industry was labelled "Sakhawood".

National days
 April 27: Republic Day
 June 21: Yhyakh festival (also known as Sakha New Year)

See also

 Cuisine of Sakha
 Lena Pillars
 List of rural localities in the Sakha Republic
 Music in the Sakha Republic
 Tuymaada
 Yakutian knife
 Yakut language

Notes

References

Citations

Sources

External links

  Official website of the government of Sakha Republic

 
Geography of Northeast Asia
East Siberian Sea
Russian Far East
Far Eastern Federal District
Laptev Sea
Members of the Unrepresented Nations and Peoples Organization
Russian-speaking countries and territories
States and territories established in 1922
1922 establishments in Russia
Observer members of the International Organization of Turkic Culture